The Cook's Revenge is a 1900 French short silent film by Georges Méliès.

Synopsis
In a kitchen, a cook attempts to kiss a waitress, and she drops a whole stack of plates in her surprise. The panicking cook, hearing the head waiter coming, hides in a cupboard. He sticks his head out to hear the waiter's remonstrances about the broken plates, and the waiter slams the cupboard door shut. The cook's head, still very much alive, comes off and begins berating the astonished chef.

The chef attempts to destroy the talking head, but it eludes him, magically changing places around the room. Finally the chef throws the head into the cupboard, and the cook comes out, again in one piece. As revenge, the cook knocks the waiter's head clean off, tosses the body aside, and cheerfully dances away.

Production and survival
Méliès himself plays the cook, one of his many roles in which he loses his head or has several duplicate heads. The special effects are created with substitution splices and multiple exposures on a black background.

The Cook's Revenge was released by Méliès's Star Film Company and is numbered 243 in its catalogues. Long presumed lost, a print of the film was eventually rediscovered in Manosque by the son of a fairground exhibitor, and sold to Méliès's granddaughter, Madeleine Malthête-Méliès.

References

External links

1900 films
French silent short films
French black-and-white films
Films directed by Georges Méliès